Dennis Báthory-Kitsz (born March 14, 1949 in Plainfield, New Jersey) (pseudonyms: Dennis Bathory, Dennis Kitsz, Dennis J. Kitsz, Dennis Bathory Kitsz, Kalvos Gesamte, Grey Shadé, D.B. Cowell, Brady Kynans, Kalvos Zondrios, Báthory Dénes, Orra Maussade, Don Johnson, Kerry Merritt, Calvin Dion, Enimtu Bemanyna) is a Hungarian-American author and composer.

Aside from music, he was an author during the first generation of personal computers (1979–85), and interviewed Bill Gates. His career in technology is evident in over 600 articles and books on the subject. He was involved in the post-Fluxus art movement (1973–78), and was also director of Vermont's Alliance of Independent Country Stores (2001–2010). Since 2010 he has been adjunct professor composition, theory, and music technology at Johnson State College.

Báthory lives in Northfield, Vermont. He claims to be a descendant of the Báthory family, a prominent central European clan during the Middle Ages but no proof of this can be found.

Music and works
A prolific composer, Báthory-Kitsz has more than 1100 compositions, sound installations, and electronic works for all manner of vocal and instrumental combinations. His compositions include sound sculpture, solo and chamber music for the instruments of classical music, electronic music, stage shows, orchestral pieces, dance music, opera, interactive multimedia, sound installations, and performance art events. He has also designed and built new musical instruments. Over the years he has earned 28 ASCAP Awards for his works.

Báthory has advocated what he calls contemporary "non-pop" music, and the performance of contemporary classical music (new music) in preference to the music of composers of past eras. He offers his compositions to be downloaded and played for free, but does not release them into the public domain and takes royalties for public performance as usual. His organ work Yer Attention, Please has been performed by Kevin Bowyer. His Dashuki Music Theatre has performed at Charlotte Moorman's Annual Avant Garde Festival of New York.

Kalvos & Damian
Dennis Báthory-Kitsz is known for co-founding and co-hosting Kalvos & Damian New Music Bazaar with the composer David Gunn. 
Kalvos & Damian's New Music Bazaar was an ASCAP/Deems Taylor Award-winning radio/web program that ran 537 shows from 1995-2005.

Ought-One festival
Dennis Báthory-Kitsz also founded and organized the Ought-One festival.

We Are All Mozart
The We Are All Mozart project (WAAM) demanded a finished commissioned composition each day in year 2007. Not a complete success the project received a 100 commissions which Dennis Báthory-Kitsz completed.

Erzsébet: The Opera
In 1987 Dennis Bathory-Kitsz was planning to write an opera about Elizabeth Bathory, a Hungarian ruler. Dennis created the "Erzsébet: The Opera" website in 1996 which was featured at Microsoft’s old home page it received millions of hits in one week. People submitted articles, artwork and novels for the website. The first article on Erzsébet: The Opera was published in "Requiem" in France in 1998. In 2001 a team from The Travel Channel found the website and sent Dennis Bathory-Kitsz to Cachtice in Slovakia for a show called "World’s Bloodiest Dungeons" A clip of the opera was on "Deadly Women" a show aired in 2004 on The Discovery Channel. The entire opera was produced by the composer in 2011.

Publications

Books
Country Stores of Vermont Dennis Bathory-Kitsz, The History Press (July 30, 2008)  (Second revised edition 2013) 
Kenneth Sawyer Goodman, a chronology & annotated bibliography Dennis Báthory-Kitsz,Newberry Library, 1983
Learning the 6809 Dennis Bathory Kitsz, Green Mountain Micro; 1st edition (1983)
The Custom TRS-80, and Other Mysteries Upland, California: IJG, 1982. paper; 340 pp., illus.

Scores
Triple quartet: for three groups of two violins, viola and cello Dennis Báthory-Kitsz, Westleaf Edition 
Binky plays marbles: a Bruckner Boulevard dance : for contrabass and viola  Dennis Báthory-Kitsz, Frog Peak Music, 1992

Discography
 Wonder and Astonishment, Intent Records, 2015
 Bombasia, Intent Records, 2012
 Bolt, Malted/Media, 2012
 Trade Winds of Vermont, Malted/Media, 2009
 Sinfonietta, Intent Records, 2009
60x60 (2004–2005) , Vox Novus VN-001, 2007
60x60 (2003), Capstone Records CPS-8744, 2004
UnLimit, Three's Film Works, 2003
Free Speech for Sale, pressthebutton, 2003)
 The Longman Anthology of British Literature: Music of English Literature, 2002
 Killer Sings!, Malted/Media, 2000
 Zonule Glaes II, Malted/Media, 1999, re-released 2012
 The Frog Peak Collaboration Project, Frog Peak Music, 1998
 Detritus of Mating, Sistrum Records, 1997
 Lucid Nightmares, Malted/Media, 1995
 Invisible Performers, Malted/Media, 1994
 The Nightmare Continues, Malted/Media, 1992
 Alive and Well: Music of Vermont Composers, Ursa Minor, 1990
 Dentist's Nightmare, Malted/Media, 1988

Interviews, Articles & reviews
 American Composer: Dennis Bathory-Kitsz by Kyle Gann, Chamber Music, November/December, 2011
We Will, We Will Nonpop You  by Kyle Gann, Village Voice, September 11, 2001 
Retuning the Dial: Rethinking the Relationship between Radio and New American Music NewMusicBox Published: May 1, 2000 
Sound Bytes of Truth  by Kyle Gann, Village Voice July 6, 1999

Selected List of Compositions
For a full list of compositions, please see here.
 Construction "on nix rest... in china" (1972), for trombones and tape 
 Somnambula (1975), for recorder and electronic sound 
 Plasm over ocean (1977), a chamber opera for small ensemble 
 Mass (1978), for small ensemble
 Rando's Poetic License (1978), for electronics, microcomputer, voices, instruments 
 Echo, A Performance Ritual in Four Parts (1985) 
 Mantra Canon (1986), for large ensemble 
 In Bocca al Lupo (1986), environmental sound design. Installation: Yellowstone Art Museum, Billings, Montana, 1986 
 Beepers (1986), a high-tech cabaret
 Rough Edges (1987), for piano
 Winter, Three Songs on the Nature of Armageddon (1987), for mezzo-soprano and orchestra
 Variations on Amanda (1989), for three strings and harpsichord
 Csárdás (1989), for piano 
 Yçuré (1990), for two chamber orchestras 
 The Lily and the Thorn (1990), for orchestra 
 Traveler's Rest and Wolf5 (1991), sound environments. Installation: Randolph, Vermont, 1991 
 A Time Machine (1990), for voice, small ensemble, dance and computers 
 Softening Cries (1991), for orchestra 
 The Pretty Songs (1991), for saxophone and voice 
 Binky Plays Marbles (1992), for double bass and viola
 Emerald Canticles, Below (1993), for small ensemble 
 Llama Butter (1993), for tuba and tape 
 Build, Make, Do (1994), for small ensemble 
 Hypertunes, Baby (1994), for voice and tape 
 xirx (1996), a performance work for electronic tape, ice and aromas 
 Gardens (1996), for English horn and string quartet
 zéyu, quânh & sweeh (1996), for playback 
 Detritus of Mating (1997), electroacoustic work. Installation: Exquisite Corpse Gallery, Burlington, Vermont, 1997 
 Into the Morning Rain (1998), for small ensemble 
 Zonule Glaes II (1999), electroacoustic work with string quartet 
 LowBirds (1999), for small ensemble 
 Sourian Slide (1999), for string orchestra 
 The Sub-Aether Bande (2000), for flute and percussion
 Quince & Fog Falls (2000), for chamber ensemble
 Mountain Dawn Fanfare (2000), for orchestra 
 RatGeyser (2000), for MalletKat and playback 
 HighBirds (Prime) (2001), for two electric guitars and playback 
 The Key of Locust (2001), for chamber trio 
 Fuliginous Quadrant (2001), for chamber ensemble 
 Mirrored Birds (2001), a flute concerto 
 Tïrkíinistrá: 25 Landscape Preludes (2002), for piano 
 Bales, Barrels, & Cones: Antebellum/Antibellum (2002), for drumkit and playback 
 Warbler Garden (2003), for electronic playback 
 Spammung (2003), for extended voice and playback 
 LiquidBirds (2003), for 3 Theremins, video, and playback 
 Northsea Balletic Spicebush (2003) for double bass 
 Shahmat (2004) for solo flute 
 Krikisque (2004), for electronic playback 
 Icecut (2004) for orchestra 
 By Still Waters (2004) for solo voice and drone
 Rose Quartz Crystal Radio (2005) for sax and percussion 
 Jameo y el Delfin Mareado (2005) for orchestra 
 Sweet Ovals (2005) for solo horn 
 L'Estampie du Chevalier (2005) for string quartet 
 Yer Attention, Please (2006) for organ 
 Clouds of Endless Summer (2006) for piano trio 
 Eventide (2006) for piccolo, small clarinet and contrabassoon
 One hundred "We Are All Mozart" compositions 
 I lift my heavy heart (2007) for voice, flute and guitar 
 Lunar Cascade in Serial Time (2007) for tenor guitar, in 13 parts 
 Mountains of Spices (2007) for mezzo-soprano, violin, viola & piano 
 Compound Refractions (2007) for flute 
 Turn Around, Bustle and Blaze (2007) for viola, horn, cello & piano 
 New Granite (2007) for flute, bass clarinet, violin, cello & piano 
 For the Beauty of the Earth (2007) for violin 
 Fanfare:Heat (2007) for orchestra 
 Morning in Nodar (2007) for double bass 
 Scalar Rainbows (2007) for piano 
 She Who Saves (2007) for two natural horns and soprano 
 O Vox Pop (2007) for bass clarinet and bassoon
 Adeste Hedecasyllabi (2007) for voice and piano 
 Framing the Sum of Three (2007) for piano 
 Autumn Dig (2008) for intermediate orchestra 
 Crosscut (2009) for piano and large wind band 
 Erzsébet (2010), chamber opera in 3 acts, and film score
 Giè (2011), small ensemble 
 O: Eleven Songs (2011), chorus SATB 
 Air (2012), harp and percussion 
 Evil Pony (2012), sax quartet
 Chelsea Moods (2012), bass clarinet and band 
 Five Hungarian Folk Songs (2013), string orchestra 
 The Forest at the South Field (2013), for percussionist 
 I think of thee (2013), voice, alto flute, guitar 
 Ave Verum Corpus: In Memoriam John Tavener (2013), for chorus 
 Aveaux Gadreaux (2014), for cello and bass clarinet 
 Thread Count (2014), for string orchestra 
 The Lake Isle of Innisfree (2014), for voice, flute and piano 
 Wonder and Astonishment (2014), for two MIDI-controlled pipe organs

References

External links
http://maltedmedia.com/people/bathory/ – personal website
Full list of compositions
Résumé

1949 births
Living people
American male classical composers
American classical composers
American people of Hungarian descent
Hungarian classical composers
Hungarian male classical composers
20th-century classical composers
21st-century classical composers
American electronic musicians
American musical instrument makers
People from Northfield, Vermont
Writers from Plainfield, New Jersey
21st-century American composers
Musicians from Plainfield, New Jersey
20th-century American composers
Classical musicians from New Jersey
20th-century American male musicians
21st-century American male musicians